Jessy Yapo Reindorf (born 10 July 1991) is a professional footballer who plays as a forward for Brétigny Foot. Born in France, he represents Rwanda at international level.

Club career
Born in Bagneux, France, Reindorf spent his early career in Italy, France and Belgium with Comacchio Lidi, CA Paris-Charenton and Union Royale Namur. While with Comacchio Lidi, Reindorf's contract and transfer arrangements was investigated by the footballing authorities.

He signed a two-year contract with English club Bury in July 2013. Reindorf scored his first goal for Bury on 27 August 2013 in 6–3 defeat to Norwich City in the League Cup; the goal was described by the BBC as a "spectacular strike," and Reindorf's performance was praised by manager Kevin Blackwell.

On 16 January 2014, Reindorf had his contract cancelled at Bury. Later that month he went on trial with Scottish club Falkirk. He signed for Tamworth in February 2014.

Reindorf signed for Sutton United in June 2014.

In January 2015 he returned to Belgium, signing with former club Union Royale Namur. He signed with Moldovan club Speranța Nisporeni for the 2015–16 season. He later played with Paris Saint-Germain C, RRC Waterloo and Royal Albert Quévy-Mons.

International career
He made his international debut for Rwanda in 2013, in a friendly against Uganda, and he has appeared in FIFA World Cup qualifying matches.

Career statistics

References

1991 births
Living people
French footballers
Rwandan footballers
Association football forwards
Rwanda international footballers
English Football League players
National League (English football) players
U.S. Comacchio Lidi players
CA Paris-Charenton players
Union Royale Namur Fosses-La-Ville players
Bury F.C. players
Tamworth F.C. players
Sutton United F.C. players
Speranța Nisporeni players
Paris Saint-Germain F.C. players
R.A.E.C. Mons players
French expatriate footballers
Rwandan expatriate footballers
French expatriate sportspeople in Italy
French expatriate sportspeople in Belgium
French expatriate sportspeople in England
French expatriate sportspeople in Moldova
Rwandan expatriate sportspeople in Italy
Rwandan expatriate sportspeople in Belgium
Rwandan expatriate sportspeople in the United Kingdom
Rwandan expatriate sportspeople in Moldova
Expatriate footballers in Italy
Expatriate footballers in Belgium
Expatriate footballers in England
Expatriate footballers in Moldova